Yuliy Sannikov (born November 3, 1978) is a Ukrainian economist known for his contributions to mathematical economics, game theory, and corporate finance. He is an economics professor at the Stanford Graduate School of Business, and won both the 2015 Fischer Black Prize and 2016 John Bates Clark Medal.

Sannikov is also one of the few participants to win three gold medals at the International Mathematical Olympiad.

He received his A.B. in mathematics from Princeton in 2000, he then earned a Ph.D. in business administration from Stanford Graduate School of Business in 2004.

Publications 
 with Markus K. Brunnermeier: The I Theory of Money. NBER Working Paper 22533, 2016, .
 with Markus K. Brunnermeier: International Credit Flows and Pecuniary Externalities. In. American Economic Journal: Macroeconomics 7(1), January 2015, 297–338, .
 with Markus K. Brunnermeier: A Macroeconomic Model with a Financial Sector. The American Economic Review 104(2), February 2014, 379–421, .
 with Dilip Abreu: An Algorithm for Two-Player Repeated Games With Perfect Monitoring. Theoretical Economics 9, 2014, 313–338, .
 with Alex Edmans, Xavier Gabaix, Tomas Sadzik: Dynamic CEO Compensation. The Journal of Finance 67(5), October 2012, 1603–1647, .
 with Eduardo Faingold: Reputation in Continuous-Time Games. Econometrica 79(3), May 2011, 773–876, .
 with Andrzej Skrzypacz: The Role of Information in Repeated Games with Frequent Actions. Econometrica 78(3), May 2010, 847–882, .
 A Continuous-Time Version of the Principal–Agent Problem. The Review of Economic Studies 75(3), July 2008, 957–984, .
 with Andrzej Skrzypacz: Impossibility of Collusion under Imperfect Monitoring with Flexible Production. The American Economic Review 97(5), December 2007, 1794–1823, .
 Games with Imperfectly Observable Actions in Continuous Time. Econometrica 75(5), September 2007, 1285–1329, .
 with Peter M. DeMarzo: Optimal Security Design and Dynamic Capital Structure in a Continuous-Time Agency Model. The Journal of Finance 61(6), December 2006, 2681–2724, .

References

External links 
 Yuliy Sannikov at Stanford University
 

1978 births
Living people
International Mathematical Olympiad participants
Princeton University alumni
Stanford University alumni
University of California, Berkeley faculty
Princeton University faculty
Stanford University Graduate School of Business faculty
Fellows of the Econometric Society
21st-century  Ukrainian economists